Belfast City Cemetery is a large cemetery in west Belfast, Northern Ireland. It lies within the townland of Ballymurphy, between Falls Road and Springfield Road, near Milltown Cemetery. It is maintained by Belfast City Council. Vandalism in the cemetery is widespread.

History
Following the Belfast Burial Ground Act (1866), the cemetery was opened on August 1, 1869 as a cross denominational burial ground for the people of Belfast, a fast-growing Victorian town at the time. The land was purchased from Thomas Sinclair. The cemetery features cast iron fountains and separate Protestant and Catholic areas, divided by a sunken wall.  Many of Belfast's wealthiest families have plots in the cemetery, particularly those involved in the linen trade. Since its opening in 1869 around 226,000 people have been buried in the cemetery.

There has been an area set aside for Belfast's Jewish residents since 1874. In this area is a memorial to Daniel Joseph Jaffe.  Daniel Jaffe was the father of Otto Jaffe, a Jewish linen exporter and former Lord Mayor of Belfast. Above the old Jewish entrance to the cemetery, Hebrew writing can clearly be identified.

In 1916 an area was dedicated to soldiers who died serving in World War I, when 296 Commonwealth service personnel were buried in the cemetery.  Those whose graves could not be marked by headstones are listed on Screen Wall memorial in Plot H.  Many of the United States Army personnel killed in the sinking of HMS Otranto in 1918 were buried in the graveyard. After the war their bodies were exhumed and repatriated to the United States.

In World War II, 274 Commonwealth service personnel, 5 of them unidentified, were buried in the cemetery, besides 3 Norwegian nationals whose graves are also maintained by the Commonwealth War Graves Commission.

As the frequent target of vandalism, many of the British Army soldiers' headstones were moved to Sir Thomas and Lady Dixon Park. In 2012, continuing vandalism of the World War I Screen Wall has led to proposals to move it to another part of the cemetery. Due to its historical importance, the cemetery is a popular tourist attraction in Belfast, with guided tours available.

On 8 April 2006, Denis Donaldson was buried in the cemetery. Donaldson was a former IRA member and  Sinn Féin politician. He was killed shortly after being named as a British spy. His burial in the City Cemetery rather than in the republican plot of Milltown Cemetery was significant, as it was seen as a final snub by the republican movement.

On 7 August 2012, an image purportedly depicting the face of Jesus (cf. Pareidolia) appeared on a tree stump in the cemetery.

Notable interments

 Sir Robert Anderson, 1st Baronet - politician, former Lord Mayor of Belfast.
 Robert Hugh Hanley Baird - businessman
 Margaret Byers - educator, activist, social reformer, missionary, and writer
 Sir George Clark, 1st Baronet - shipbuilder
 Samuel Cleland Davidson - inventor and founder of Belfast Sirocco Works
 Denis Donaldson - Former IRA member and  Sinn Féin politician; killed as a British spy.
 Vere Henry Louis Foster - educationist and philanthropist
 Tom Gallaher - tobacco merchant
 Edward Harland - shipbuilder
 James Henderson - Unionist politician, former Lord Mayor of Belfast.
 John Hopkinson - physicist
 Daniel Joseph Jaffe - Built Belfast's first synagogue; father of Otto Jaffe, former Lord Mayor of Belfast. 
 Florence Augusta Lewis - mother of C.S. Lewis
 Robert Wilson Lynd - author.
 William Henry Lynn - architect
 Thomas Macknight - Political author and biographer.
 Francis Maginn - missionary
 Valentine McMaster - Victoria Cross (VC) recipient (Indian Mutiny).
 Bernard McQuirt - VC recipient, Indian Mutiny. (Grave in pauper plot unmarked; commemorative headstone at Donaghcloney, County Armagh).
 Rinty Monaghan - boxer
 William Pirrie, 1st Viscount Pirrie
 Elisha Scott - football player
 Robert Thompson - politician
 Sam Thompson - playwright
 William Whitla - physician and politician

References

Further reading

External links

 Belfast City Cemetery 

Cemeteries in Belfast
Cemetery vandalism and desecration
Commonwealth War Graves Commission cemeteries in Northern Ireland
Geography of Belfast
Religion in Belfast
Burials at Belfast City Cemetery